Lee Elwood Holdridge (born March 3, 1944) is a Haitian-born American composer, conductor, and orchestrator. A 18-time Emmy Award nominee, he has won two Primetime Emmy Awards, two Daytime Emmy Awards, two News & Documentary Emmy Awards, and one Sports Emmy Award. He has also been nominated for two Grammy Awards.

Life and career
Holdridge was born in Port-au-Prince, Haiti, of a Puerto Rican mother and an American father,  Leslie Holdridge, a botanist and climatologist.

While living in Costa Rica, at age ten, he studied the violin with Hugo Mariani, who was at the time the conductor of the National Symphony Orchestra of Costa Rica. He then moved to Boston, where he finished high school and studied composition with Henry Lasker.

As an adult, Holdridge moved to New York City to continue his music studies and begin his career as a professional composer. There, he composed chamber works, rock pieces, songs, theater music and background scores for short films, and eventually came to Neil Diamond's notice. Diamond then brought Holdridge with him to Los Angeles to write arrangements for his forthcoming albums. After several gold and platinum hits, the two collaborated on the Grammy Award winning score for producer/director Hall Bartlett's film adaptation of Jonathan Livingston Seagull.  Neil Diamond sued Bartlett for cutting much of his music from the film. Diamond was also against sharing musical credit with Holdridge; however, the Academy of Motion Picture Arts & Sciences ruled in Holdridge's favor. Bartlett was ordered to reinstate the five minutes of Diamond's music score and three of his songs, "Anthem", "Prologue", and "Dear Father", and that the onscreen credits were to state "Music and songs by Neil Diamond", "Background score composed and adapted by Neil Diamond and Lee Holdridge", and "Music supervision by Tom Catalano".

Holdridge has composed and orchestrated for many films, including:
 Jeremy (1973)
 Forever Young, Forever Free (1975)
 Mustang Country (1976)
 The Pack (1977)
 The Other Side of the Mountain Part 2 (1978)
 Like Mom, Like Me (1978)
 Moment by Moment (1978)
 Tilt (1979)
 French Postcards (1979)
 American Pop (1981)
 The Day the Loving Stopped (1981)
 The Beastmaster (1982)
 Mr. Mom (1983)
 Splash (1984)
 Micki & Maude (1984)
 Transylvania 6-5000 (1985)
 The Men's Club (1986)
 A Tiger's Tale (1987)
 Big Business (1988)
 Old Gringo (1989)
 The Adventures of Pinocchio (1996)
 Into Thin Air: Death on Everest (1997)
 The Secret of NIMH 2: Timmy to the Rescue (1998)
 Into the Arms of Strangers: Stories of the Kindertransport (2000)
 Puerto Vallarta Squeeze (2004)
 Brothers at War (2009).

He composed for several television series, including: 
 Sara
 East of Eden
 I'll Take Manhattan
 Atomic Train
 The Mists of Avalon
 American Family
 The Brooke Ellison Story
 Moonlighting
 Beauty and the Beast
 10.5

Holdridge has performed and recorded in several concerts, including The Golden Land, the Jefferson Tribute, his suite from the opera Lazarus and His Beloved, the Concerto for Viola and Chamber Orchestra, the Concertino for Violoncello and Strings, the Serenade for Oboe and Strings, the Fantasy Sonata for ‘Cello and Piano, the Elegy for Strings and Harp, and Sonnet for soprano and orchestra.

Personal life
Holdridge is married to ex-ballet dancer Elisa Justice. She is western region audition co-director of the Metropolitan Opera National Council, hosts her own classical music radio show called "Eclectic Classics", and has co-produced a new album and documentary with Milt Okun called Great Voices Sing John Denver. She won a "Best Producer" award for a documentary at the Madrid International Film Festival.

Awards and nominations
Primetime Emmy awards:
Nominated, 1985, Outstanding Achievement in Music and Lyrics for: Moonlighting theme song
Nominated, 1988, Outstanding Achievement in Main Title Theme Music for: Beauty and the BeastWon, 1988, Outstanding Achievement in Music Composition for a Series (Dramatic Underscore)for: Beauty and the Beast pilot episode
Won, 1989, Outstanding Achievement in Music and Lyrics for: Beauty and the Beast song "The First Time I Loved Forever"
Nominated, 1990, Outstanding Achievement in Music Composition for a Miniseries or a Special (Dramatic Underscore) for: "Do You Know the Muffin Man"?
Nominated, 1993, Outstanding Individual Achievement in Music Composition for a Miniseries or a Special (Dramatic Underscore) for: "Call of the Wild"
Nominated, 1993, Outstanding Individual Achievement in Main Title Theme Music for: BobNominated, 1995, Outstanding Individual Achievement in Music Composition for a Miniseries or a Special (Dramatic Underscore) for: Buffalo Girls Part I
Nominated, 1996, Outstanding Individual Achievement in Music Composition for a Miniseries or a Special for: The Tuskegee AirmenNominated, 1999, Outstanding Music Composition for a Miniseries or a Movie (Dramatic Underscore) for: MutinyNominated, 2002, Outstanding Music Composition for a Miniseries, Movie or a Special (Dramatic Underscore) for: The Mists of AvalonDaytime Emmy awards:
Won, 2000, Outstanding Achievement in Music Direction and Composition for a Drama Series for: One Life to LiveNominated, 2002, Outstanding Achievement in Music Direction and Composition for a Drama Series for: One Life to LiveNominated, 2004, Outstanding Achievement in Music Direction and Composition for a Drama Series for: One Life to LiveWon, 2005, Outstanding Achievement in Music Direction and Composition for a Drama Series for: One Life to LiveNominated, 2006, Outstanding Achievement in Music Direction and Composition for a Drama Series for: One Life to LiveSports Emmy awards:
Won, 1998, Outstanding Achievement in a Craft: Music Composition/Direction/Lyrics for: Atlanta's Olympic GloryNews and Documentary Emmy awards:
Won, 1988, Outstanding Individual Achievement in Music for: The Explorers: A Century of DiscoveryWon, 1991, Outstanding Individual Achievement in a Craft: Music Composition for: World of Discovery episode "Beautiful Killers"

Grammy awards:
Won, 1974, Best Original Score Written for a Motion Picture or a Television Special for: Jonathan Livingston Seagull soundtrack (shared with Neil Diamond, Tom Catalano and others).
Nominated, 1988, Best Song Written Specifically for a Motion Picture or for Television for: Moonlighting theme song.

ASCAP Awards:
Won, 1988, Top TV Series for: Moonlighting (1985)

Further reading
 New York Theatre Critics' Reviews: Index, 1940-1960. Original from the University of Michigan.
 Of Love & Hope - Selections Form Beauty and the Beast By Lee Holdridge, Don Davis, Milton Okun, Larry Kenton, Edwin McLean. Published 1990, Cherry Lane Music. 

See also
 List of music arrangers

References

External links
 
 
 
 
 PBS biography as composer for American Valor''
 

1944 births
20th-century American composers
20th-century American conductors (music)
20th-century classical composers
21st-century American composers
21st-century American conductors (music)
21st-century classical composers
Film score composers
American film score composers
Film score composers
American male conductors (music)
American music arrangers
American opera composers
American people of Puerto Rican descent
American television composers
Daytime Emmy Award winners
Grammy Award winners
Haitian classical musicians
Haitian composers
Haitian emigrants to the United States
John Denver
Living people
American male film score composers
Male opera composers
Neil Diamond
Sports Emmy Award winners
Varèse Sarabande Records artists